Mirko Bruccini (born 18 January 1986) is an Italian footballer who plays for Serie D club Franciacorta.

Biography
Born in La Spezia, Liguria region, Bruccini started his career at hometown club Spezia. In August 2007 he was signed by Castelnuovo of Serie C2. In summer 2008 he left for Pro Patria. He remained with the club even the club was in financial trouble in 2009, which he spent almost 5 more seasons for the Lombard club.

On 3 January 2014 he was signed by Cremonese.

On 21 July 2014 Bruccini was signed by Reggiana.

On 7 January 2021 he moved to Alessandria.

On 31 January 2022, Bruccini signed with Mantova.

On 19 August 2022, he joined Serie D club Franciacorta.

References

External links
 AIC profile (data by football.it) 

1986 births
People from La Spezia
Sportspeople from the Province of La Spezia
Footballers from Liguria
Living people
Italian footballers
Association football midfielders
Spezia Calcio players
Aurora Pro Patria 1919 players
U.S. Cremonese players
A.C. Reggiana 1919 players
S.S.D. Lucchese 1905 players
Cosenza Calcio players
U.S. Alessandria Calcio 1912 players
Mantova 1911 players
Serie B players
Serie C players
Serie D players